Rémi Babinet (born 1957 in Paris, France) is a French creative director, best known for his work on Evian's "Live Young" campaign. His official title is Founding Chairman of BETC and Global Chief Creative Officer of Havas.  He is also the author of the book "BETC Paris – Global Advertising Agency".

Career 

Babinet's advertising career began in the late 1980s with internships at Saatchi & Saatchi, Y&R and BDDP (now TBWA Paris). In 1986 BDDP hired him as a copywriter and he eventually rose to the position of Creative Director. During that period, and alongside art director partner Philippe Pollet-Villard, he produced campaigns for Polaroid, Virgin Megastore, BMW, McCain, Le Monde, Wonderbra, Galeries Lafayette and Canal+.
In 1995, Babinet founded agency Babinet Tong Cuong alongside associate Eric Tong Cuong. Mercedes Erra joined them in 1995 and the agency was renamed Babinet Erra Tong Cuong Euro RSCG. Tong Cuong left the company in 2002. In July 2005, Babinet was made Chief Creative Officer of Euro RSCG Worldwide (today known as Havas Worldwide).
From 2003 to 2007, Babinet was President of the French Art Directors Club  and in June 2014, he will preside over the Press Jury at the Cannes Lions International Festival of Creativity.

In May 2016, Forbes Magazine selected Rémi Babinet as one of the world's 10 Best Creative Directors.

BETC 

BETC, a French advertising agency, was co-founded by Babinet in 1995. Babinet has spoken extensively about what he believes sets BETC apart from other agencies. In an interview with Brazil's Meio & Mensagem publication, he claims the difference stems from two things: "The first is that we do not have a creative process formalized: No rules, no preconceived ideas." The second is that they "do not believe in the culture of globalization, a mold that fits all. We believe that a strong brand globally needs to have powerful roots."
Building on that last idea, Babinet has said BETC makes a conscious effort to separate itself from how people perceive the French, a culture he calls "unique" but something people either "love or hate". He considers BETC an "international brand" that retains a French identity because of its work with renowned French brands, such as Air France, Evian and Lacoste.
On advertising in general, Babinet has said he finds "simplicity is the most difficult of all to achieve."

He  has  consistently  challenged  the  traditional  limits  of  advertising, opening up his agency to new creative  fields and emerging talents: organisation of the mythic Panik parties with  BETC  POP,  creation  of  the  label  POP  Records,  publishing of the  book  Graffiti General,  programming of new  spaces  such  as  the  gallery  Passage du  Désir  and soon  a new creative  space  open  to  the  public  in the Magasins  généraux  in  Pantin. With  his  influence, BETC  has  pushed  the  boundaries  of  advertising  and has become a cultural and artistic driver. Creative Review defined it as “also an ad agency”.

In 2008, Babinet wrote the book ‘BETC Paris’, distributed by BIS Publishers. The book is an overview of BETC's trajectory, work and agency culture, with a special focus on its efforts in music, fashion, design and photography.

BETC London was opened in 2011, beginning the process of expansion of BETC Network. In 2014 BETC São Paulo was opened, meeting the expectations of success in the local market.

Babinet continues to act as Global Creative Director for several of BETC's largest clients, including Air France and Evian, whose “Rollerbabies” campaign was listed in the Guinness Book of World Records as the most-viewed online ad to date (45,166,109 views at the time of its 2009 distinction).

In July 2016 BETC moved to Les Magasins généraux in Pantin, a building dedicated to creation and innovation. BETC and in particular Rémi will take a major role in the rehabilitation of the city with a great involvement in cultural and social activities for the inhabitants of its new Greater Paris area.

Personal life 

Rémi Babinet was born in 1957 in the Paris suburb of Suresnes. His father is a university law professor and his mother operates an independent children's bookstore in Strasbourg.

References 

Living people
French advertising executives
French art directors
1957 births
People from Suresnes